Encounter for Democracy and Equality (EDE), more commonly known as New Encounter is a kirchnerist political party in Argentina founded in 2004 by then-mayor of Morón, Martín Sabbatella. The party now forms part of the Frente de Todos, the ruling coalition supporting President Alberto Fernández.

From 2009 to 2015, the party was aligned with the Communist Party and the Solidary Party in a front called New Encounter, from which the EDE took its current common name.

History
The Encounter for Democracy and Equality was officially launched as a political party on 14 September 2004 by then-intendente (mayor) of Morón, Martín Sabbatella. Sabbatella had until then led his own local party, called Nuevo Morón ("New Morón"), and had belonged to the Broad Front and been involved with the Communist Party Youth, as well as the Front for a Country in Solidarity (Frepaso). According to Sabbatella, the party was partly inspired by the Uruguayan Broad Front.

In 2009, ahead of the nationwide legislative election, Sabbatella and the EDE formed a coalition with the Communist Party, the Solidary Party, the Freemen of the South Movement, the Workers' Central Union, among others; the coalition was named New Encounter. Sabbatella ran in the Buenos Aires Province party list as the first candidate, and the coalition eventually won 2,15% of the overall national vote and secured two seats in the Chamber of Deputies (the other elected deputy was Graciela Iturraspe).

Ahead of the 2011 general election, New Encounter officially endorsed Cristina Fernández de Kirchner's bid for re-election, joining the broader Front for Victory.

In 2015 New Encounter, the coalition, finally dissolved due to internal differences between its member parties. In 2017 the EDE, now popularly known as "New Encounter" itself, joined the Citizen's Unity coalition formed by former president Cristina Fernández de Kirchner in the aftermath of Mauricio Macri's victory in the 2015 presidential election and the dissolution of the Front for Victory, rejoining its previous allied parties, but now as part of the pan-kirchnerist coalition. At the 2017 legislative election, the party (which ran under the Citizen's Unity list) got three of its members elected to the Chamber of Deputies: Hugo Yasky (chief of the Workers' Central Union), Mónica Macha, and Gabriela Cerruti.

Ideology

At the time of the party's foundation, Argentine media covering it and Sabatella himself described it as a "progressive" group, modelling itself after the Uruguayan Broad Front.

During his time in Congress, Sabbatella voted selectively in favor and against the Front for Victory government's proposed bills, and initially refused to explicitly align New Encounter with Cristina Fernández de Kirchner and her supporters in Congress. However, following Fernández de Kirchner's landslide victory in the 2011 presidential election, Sabbatella declared the party to be "[like] another leg of the kirchnerist table", meaning the party would officially become part of the government-aligned bloc without "losing its own identity".

Electoral performance

President

Chamber of Deputies

See also
Argentine Workers' Central Union
Carlos Heller
Front for Victory

References

External links
Official website 

Political parties established in 2004
2004 establishments in Argentina
Center-left parties in Argentina
Kirchnerism
Peronist parties and alliances in Argentina